The 2006 Torneo Descentralizado (known as the Copa Cable Mágico for sponsorship reasons) was the ninetieth season of Peruvian football. A total of 12 teams competed in the tournament, with Sporting Cristal as the defending champion. Alianza Lima won its twenty-second Primera División title after beating Cienciano in the final playoffs. The season began on February 3, 2006 and ended on December 27, 2006.

Changes from 2005

Structural changes
Number of teams reduced from 13 to 12.
Season final to be played over two legs (home and away) instead of one leg at a neutral venue.
The relegation would be decided by the season aggregate table; three-season average relegation table removed.

Promotion and relegation
Universidad César Vallejo and Atlético Universidad finished the 2005 season in 11th and 12th place, respectively, on the three-season average table and thus were relegated to the Segunda División. They were replaced by the champion of the Copa Perú 2005 José Gálvez.

Season overview
Alianza Lima won the Apertura tournament which allowed them to qualify to the Copa Libertadores 2007. Universitario and Cienciano tied for first in the Clausura tournament and were forced to play a playoff. The playoff was a single game, played on a neutral ground, in Trujillo at Estadio Mansiche. Cienciano won the playoff 2–1, qualifying to the Copa Libertadores 2007. Sporting Cristal placed second on the aggregate table, which allowed them to qualify to the first stage of the Copa Libertadores 2007. The winners of the Apertura and Clausura tournaments, Alianza Lima and Cienciano, played in a two-legged final. Both teams won their home games, but due to goal difference, Alianza Lima won their twenty-second national title. Unión Huaral placed last on the aggregate table which meant they were relegated to the second division. José Gálvez FBC and Sport Boys tied for second-to-last place. A playoff was contested and Sport Boys won 5–4 in the penalty shootout after a 0–0 draw.

Teams

Torneo Apertura

Torneo Clausura

Clausura play-off

Cienciano advanced to the season finals.

Finals

Alianza Lima won 3–2 on aggregate; 2006 season champion

Title

Aggregate table

10th/11th place play-off

José Gálvez relegated to Segunda División.

References

External links
Peru 2006 season Details on RSSSF
Peruvian Football 

Peruvian Primera División seasons
Peru
Torneo Descentralizado, 2006